Josef Herbert Furth (J. Herbert Furth, October 12, 1899, Vienna, Austria – March 6, 1995, Chevy Chase, Maryland, United States) was Austrian and American jurist and  economist.

He was the son of Ernestine von Fürth, née "Kisch", the founder and leader of the women's suffrage movement in Austria.

In 1938, after Austria's annexation to Nazi Germany Furth emigrated to the United States.

Career 
Professor of Economics, Lincoln University, Lincoln, PA, 1939–1943; Lecturer at Catholic University, Washington, D.C, 1945–1950; Adjunct Professor (Lecturer) at The American University, Washington, D.C. 1950–1966; Visiting Professor, International University of Luxembourg, 1960; Lecturer at the Foreign Service Institute, 1966–1974.

He served with the Federal Reserve Board as economic specialist (1943–1967), Chief of the Eastern European and Near Eastern Section (1948–1952),  Chief of the Western European and Commonwealth Section (1952–1956), Chief of the International Financial Operations Section  (1956–1957), Associate Adviser (1957–1960), Adviser and Associate Economist to the Federal Open Market Committee (1961–1964), Consultant (1964–1967).

References 

1899 births
1995 deaths
20th-century American economists
Jewish emigrants from Austria to the United States after the Anschluss
Catholic University of America faculty
American people of Austrian-Jewish descent
People from Chevy Chase, Maryland